The 1964 season was Djurgårdens IF's 64th in existence, their 20th season in Allsvenskan and their fourth consecutive season in the league. They were competing in Allsvenskan and 1964–65 Inter-Cities Fairs Cup.

Player statistics
Appearances for competitive matches only.

|}

Goals

Total

Competitions

Overall

Allsvenskan

League table

References
http://www.fotbollsweden.se

Djurgårdens IF Fotboll seasons
Djurgarden
Swedish football championship-winning seasons